The Alfortville Armenian Genocide Memorial bombing was a hit-team headed attack undertaken by Grey Wolves member Abdullah Çatlı and paid for by the Turkish National Intelligence Organization. It occurred on 3 May 1984, in a heavily Armenian populated district of Alfortville, Val-de-Marne, Île-de-France.

The target chosen for the attack was a memorial dedicated to the victims of the Armenian genocide on the rue Étienne Dolet which was inaugurated on 24 April 1984, the 69th anniversary of the Armenian genocide. The Turkish press denounced the monument as a "monument of hate". About a week after the inauguration, three bombs were reported to have exploded on 3 May 1984, resulting in thirteen injuries, two of them serious. The monument, made of Khachkar stone, was severely damaged in the blasts. The mayor of Alfortville at the time, Joseph Franceschi, who was also the Secretary of State for Public Security, condemned the attack. Jean Poperen, who was the National Secretary for the Socialist Party of France, also condemned the attack and expressed his solidarity with the Armenians of France.

An investigation was begun immediately after the attack.  It was later reported by one newspaper that the attack was operated by the Turkish National Intelligence Organization or MİT. The memorial bombing came after several bombings that occurred against Armenian institutions and monuments throughout France, such as the bombing of the Armenian Cultural Center in Alfortville in 1983.

A second attack occurred during the evening of 13 April 2002; three unknown assailants threw three molotov cocktails at the monument, causing serious damage. The attack occurred within days of the 87th anniversary of the Armenian genocide. An investigation was launched by the local Alfortville police but the assailants were never caught.

References

Anti-Armenianism in Europe
Grey Wolves (organization) attacks
Hate crimes in Europe
History of Val-de-Marne
Improvised explosive device bombings in 1984
Improvised explosive device bombings in France
May 1984 crimes
May 1984 events in Europe
Terrorist incidents in France in 1984
Terrorist incidents in Île-de-France
Vandalized works of art
20th century in Île-de-France
1984 crimes in France